This is a list of surviving ships which existed in the ancient or prehistoric era. They are widely known today through archaeological artifacts. All the ships on this list date to 5th century AD or before.

See also 
 List of oldest surviving ships
 List of longest ships
 List of longest wooden ships
 Museum ship
 List of museum ships

Notes

References 

Ancient